Antirrhinum hispanicum, the Spanish snapdragon, is a species of flowering plant belonging to the genus Antirrhinum that is native to southeastern Spain.

Description

It is a perennial herbaceous plant  with short, procumbent or ascending stems. The plant is glandular to glandular hairy.

Inflorescences in terminal clusters of leaf- like bracts. Flowers are hermaphrodite, zygomorphic, of calyx five-lobed almost entirely separate and corolla color white to pink or purple. Fruit in the form of a capsule that gives off ovoid seeds of black color.

References

External links
 
 

hispanicum 
flora of Spain